Pontypool is a town in Wales, United Kingdom. 

Pontypool may also refer to:

 Pontypool (UK Parliament constituency)
 Pontypool RFC, Welsh rugby union team
 Pontypool, Ontario, Canada
 Pontypool Changes Everything, 1995 fiction novel
 Pontypool (film), 2008 Canadian horror film

See also